This is a list of airports in Oregon (a U.S. state), grouped by type and sorted by location. It contains all public-use and military airports in the state. Some former airports may be included where notable.

For private-use airports, see the list of private-use airports in Oregon.

Airports

Footnotes:

See also 
 Essential Air Service
 Oregon World War II Army Airfields
 Wikipedia:WikiProject Aviation/Airline destination lists: North America#Oregon

References 
Federal Aviation Administration (FAA):
 FAA Airport Data (Form 5010) from National Flight Data Center (NFDC), also available from AirportIQ 5010
 National Plan of Integrated Airport Systems (2017–2021), released September 2016
 Passenger Boarding (Enplanement) Data for CY 2016 (final), released October 2017

State:
 Oregon Department of Aviation

Other sites used as a reference when compiling and updating this list:
 Aviation Safety Network – used to check IATA airport codes
 Great Circle Mapper: Airports in Oregon – used to check IATA and ICAO airport codes
 Abandoned & Little-Known Airfields: Oregon – used for information on former airports

 
Airports
Oregon
Airports